Udaya Prasanna Vithanage (born 14 March 1962) is a Sri Lankan filmmaker. He is considered one of the pioneers of the third generation of the Sri Lankan cinema. He has directed eight feature films including Death on a Full Moon Day (1997), August Sun (2003), Flowers of the Sky (2008) & With You, Without You (2012) and won many prestigious national and international awards and have also been commercially successful in Sri Lanka. In his early theatre work, he translated and produced plays by international writers, adapted works of world literature to film. He has battled against the censorship in Sri Lanka and worked as an educator of cinema who has conducted many Master classes in the subcontinent for young filmmakers and enthusiasts.

Life and career

1980s–1997
Prasanna Vithanage became involved in theatre after leaving school. He translated and directed George Bernard Shaw's play, Arms and the Man, in 1986. In 1991, he translated and directed a production of Italian Dario Fo's Trumpets and Raspberries.

In 1991, he directed his first film, Sisila Gini Gani (Ice of Fire). It won nine OCIC (Sri Lanka) awards, including Best Director, Best Actor and Best Actress.

In 1996 he released his second feature Anantha Rathriya (Dark Night of the Soul) which he wrote and directed. It was based on Leo Tolstoy's last novel Resurrection. It was shown at several international film festivals and won a Jury's Special Mention in the First Pusan International Film Festival. The film won all the main awards at the 1996 Sri Lanka Film Critics' Forum Awards (affiliated with FIPRESCI), including awards for Most Outstanding Film, Best Director and Best Screenwriter.

In 1997 his third feature, Purahanda Kaluwara (Death on a Full Moon Day), which he wrote and directed, was produced by NHK (Japanese Broadcasting Corporation). It won the Grand Prix at the Amiens Film Festival. Initially banned in Sri Lanka by the minister in charge of film industry, it was released after a year long legal battle. It was released by the ruling of the Supreme Court. It has become one of the most commercially successful films in Sri Lanka. Pawuru Walalu (Walls Within) was also released that year. It won the Best Actress Award for Nita Fernando in her role as Violet, at the 1998 Singapore International Film Festival. It won ten of eleven awards, including Best Picture and Best Director, at the Sri Lanka Film Critics' Forum Awards.

1998–2012
In 2003 Vithanage completed Ira Madiyama (August Sun) as his fifth film. It won many international awards and was featured prominently in the world festival circuit.

In 2008, Vithanage co-produced the hit film Machan a comedy about a group of working class con artists posing as a handball team, directed by Uberto Pasolini, who produced The Full Monty. Machan premiered at the 65th Venice Film Festival in 2008. It won 11 international awards.

That year Vithanage's sixth feature film as director, "Akasa Kusum" (Flowers of the Sky) premiered at a festival in Busan. It was screened at more than 30 film festivals and won numerous international awards. A Tamil-dubbed version of Akasa Kusum titled Aagaya Pookkal was screened in Jaffna on 1 April 2011. It was the only movie premiere of a Sinhala film director to have been held in Jaffna during the past 30 years.

In 2012 his 7th feature film, Oba Nathuwa Oba Ekka (With You, Without You), had its world premier in the "World Greats" section at the 39th Montreal International Film Festival. Written by Prasanna, Oba Nathuwa Oba Ekka is adapted from a novella by Fyodor Dostoyevsky (A Gentle Creature, a.k.a. The Meek One) and set in post-war Sri Lanka. On the international festival run, by late 2013 the film had won 5 international awards, including "best picture" in France and Italy. It earned a nomination for best picture at the 2013 Asia Pacific Screen Awards in Australia.

2013–2017
On 30 March 2013, Vithanage founded the 'Prasanna Vithanage Academy of Acting' in Sri Lanka, for aspiring acting students.

2015 saw his first and only documentary feature Vithanage, titled "Usaviya Nihandai" (Silence in the Courts), an investigative docudrama chronicling the events followed, after a Wife of a robbery suspect was being raped by the presiding magistrate of the case and an alternative newspaper editor exposing that case, engaging in a prolonged legal battle that extended into a probable impeachment of chief justice of the country, but eventually accused parties getting away scot-free while denying justice to the victim.

When asked "Why did you choose this story to explore social justice in Sri Lanka?, Prasanna Vithanage replied saying, "The fairness of carrying out social justice is best judged by how judicial branch will act when one of their members is accused. My goal was to go into depth and unearth the real story from the original sources and a re-enactment of those incidents in the form of a docudrama." After its world premiere at Sakhalin International Film Festival in Russia in Fall 2015, Usaviya Nihandai had a successful theatrical run in Sri Lanka, despite being initially banned from public screening by the Colombo District Court of Sri Lanka. This marked the second instance where one of Prasanna Vithanage's movies was banned from public screening. In both cases Prasanna won the court ruling which overturned the initial ban of both movies, which ultimately resulted in successful theatrical runs in Sri Lanka.

2018
Prasanna Vithanage embarked on his dream project ‘Gaadi – Children of the Sun’. It premiered at the Busan International Film Festival, in October 2019 and had its European premiere at the Rotterdam International Film Festival, in January 2020.

Personal life
Born in Panadura, Sri Lanka, a suburb outside Colombo, Prasanna attended D. S. Senanayake College, in Colombo, a leading national school for his secondary education. In 1991 he married actress Damayanthi Fonseka, a younger sister of Malini Fonseka, arguably the most popular actress of Sinhala Cinema.

Filmography

Theatre

Direction and translation
 Dwithwa, from Dario Fo's Trumpets and Raspberries (1991)
 Horu Samaga Heluwen, from Daro Fo's The Virtuous Burglar & One Was Nude and One Wore Tails (2006)
 Debiddo – new production of Dwithwa (2010)

Translation
 Puthra Samagama, from Alexender Vampilov's The Elder Son (1985)

Awards

Sisila Gini Gani (Ice on Fire)
9 OCIC Awards including Best Director
7 Swarna Sanka Awards including Best Director
2 Sarasavi Awards

Anantha Rathriya (Dark Night of the Soul)
2 SIGNIS film awards
2 Sarasaviya film awards
8 Sri Lanka Film critics forum (affiliated to FIPRESCI) Awards including Best Director
Honourable mention at the first Pusan International Film Festival

Pawuru Wallalu (Walls Within)
9 OCIC awards
6 Presidential Awards
10 Sri Lanka film critics (affiliated to FIPRESCI) awards
Best Actress (Singapore) Prize of the city of Amiens
GPCI Award
NETPAC Award at Amiens Film Festival

Puruhanda Kaluwara (Death on a Full Moon Day)
5 SIGNIS film awards including Best Director
4 Sarasavi film awards including Best Picture
Grand Prix – Amiens
NETPAC Award – Amiens
International Critic's Award – Fribourg
Best Actor – Singapore

Ira Madiyama (August Sun)
Grand Prix (Special Mention) "Le Regard d'or" – Fribourg International Film Festival 2004
FIPRESCI-NETPAC Award – 17th Singapore International Film Festival 2004
Best Film, Silver Award – Las Palmas International Film Festival 2004
Best Actress – Las Palmas International Film Festival 2004
Grand Jury Prize – 6th Makati Cinemanila International Film Festival 2004
10 Presidential Awards
9 Sarasavi Film Awards
9 Signis Film Awards

Akasa Kusum (Flowers of the Sky)
Awards
 10 SIGNIS film awards (Sri Lanka) including Best Film.
 Silver Peacock Award (Best Actress – Malini Fonseka), Indian International Film Festival (IFFF), India
 Best Actress – Malini Fonseka, Levante International Film Festival, Italy
 Jury Special Mention Award, Vesoul Asian Film Festival, France
 Best Asian Film (NETPAC) Award – Granada Cinesdelsur Film Festival, Spain
 Best Film – SAARC Film Festival 2012
 Best Actress – Malini Fonseka – SAARC Film Festival 2012

Official Selections
 Pusan International Film Festival, Korea (World Premiere)
 Brisbane International Film Festival, Australia
– Nominee, International Federation of Film Critics (FIPRESCI) Award
 Asia Pacific Screen Awards, Australia
– Nominee, Best Actress Malini Fonseka
 South Asian International Film Festival (SAIFF), New York City
 International Film Festival of Kerala, India
 Palm Springs International Film Festival, USA
 Tiburon International Film Festival, USA
 Asiatica Filmmediale, Italy
 Singapore International Film Festival, Singapore
 London Asian Film Festival, United Kingdom
 Fukuoka International Film Festival, Japan
 New Jersey Independent South Asian Cine Fest, US

Oba Nathuwa Oba Ekka (With You, Without You)
Cyclo d'Or – Best Film, Vesoul International Film Festival
NETPAC, Vesoul International Film Festival
SIGNIS, Milano -African Asian Latin American Film Festival
Silver Peacock Award (Best Actress – Anjali Patil), Indian International Film Festival (IFFF), India
Critics' Choice Award - Sakhalin International Film Festival, Russia
 33rd Sarasaviya Awards Colombo Sri Lanka 2017
 Best Director
 Best Actress
 Best Screenplay
 Merit Award for acting - Maheswarie Ratnam
 Presidential Film Awards Colombo Sri Lanka 2017
 Best Film
 Best Director
 Best Actor 
 Best Actress
 Best Screenplay
 Best Editing
 Best Original Score
 Best Sound Design

Silence in the Courts (Usawiya Nihandai)
 Sakhalin International Film Festival (Russia) - World Premiere
 Special Jury Award - Sarasaviya Awards
 Special Jury Award - Derana Film Awards
 Special Jury Award - Hiru Gold Awards

Gaadi - Children of the Sun
 Special Jury Mention (Asian Film Competition Section) - 18th Dhaka International Film Festival 2020
 Emerald Dove Award - 3rd Independent Film Festival of Chennai 2020
 14th Asia Pacific Screen Awards: Cultural Diversity Award (UNESCO) (2021)

Theatre Awards

Puthra Samagama
Best Translation - State Drama Festival 1985
Best Translation - Divaina Sama Festival 1985

Avi
Special Jury Award - Best Translation & Direction 1987
Best Play (Cowinner) - Divaina Sama Festival 1987

Dwithva
 Best Translation, Best Director & Best Play - State Drama Festival 1992

Literary Awards

Puthra Samagama
 Best Translation for theatre - State Literary Festival 2011

Special Awards
 Emerald Award - Seattle South Asian Film Festival 2014
 Bishwaratna Dr. Bhupen Hazarika International Solidarity Award 2017

References

External links

 
 

 
1962 births
Living people
Kala Keerthi
20th-century Sri Lankan male writers
20th-century Sri Lankan writers
21st-century Sri Lankan male writers
21st-century Sri Lankan writers
Alumni of D. S. Senanayake College
People from Panadura
Sinhala-language film directors
Sri Lankan documentary filmmakers
Sri Lankan film directors
Sri Lankan film producers
Sri Lankan male screenwriters